Maverick is the sixth album by the band George Thorogood and the Destroyers.  It was produced by Terry Manning and released in January 1985. Some of its songs are among Thorogood's best-known, including "I Drink Alone" and "Willie and the Hand Jive", the latter being his only single to reach the Billboard Hot 100 chart.

Track listing
 "Gear Jammer" (George Thorogood) – 4:39
 "I Drink Alone" (Thorogood) – 4:35
 "Willie and the Hand Jive" (Johnny Otis) – 4:09
 "What a Price" (Fats Domino, Murphy Maddux^, Jack Jessup) – 2:48
 "Long Gone" (Thorogood) – 4:30
 "Dixie Fried" (Carl Perkins, Howard Griffin) – 3:46
 "Crawlin' King Snake" (John Lee Hooker) – 4:02
 "Memphis/Little Marie" (Chuck Berry) – 5:54
 "Woman with the Blues" (Thorogood) – 3:34
 "Go, Go, Go" (Berry) – 3:32
 "The Ballad of Maverick" (David Buttolph, Paul Francis Webster) – 2:05

^ Murphy Maddux is listed in the album credits as "M. Muddux"

Personnel

Musicians
George Thorogood – guitar, vocals
Hank Carter – saxophones, harmony vocals
Billy Blough – bass
Jeff Simon – drums, percussion

Technical
 Terry Manning – producer, engineer
 Ken Irwin – assistant producer
 Randy Ezratty – assistant engineer
 Bob Ludwig – mastering
 Henry Marquez – art direction
 Art Sims – design
 Caroline Greyshock – photography
 David Gahr – photography

Charts

References

1985 albums
George Thorogood and the Destroyers albums
EMI America Records albums
Albums produced by Terry Manning